Minemhat (Min is at the front) was the mayor of Koptos during the 17th Dynasty. Minemhat appears in three sources making him one of the best attested private individuals of the period and attesting that he was a highly influential person.

Attestations

Serving under Nubkheperre Intef
Minemhat appears on the Coptos Decree dates to Year 3 of King Nubkheperre Intef. This is a royal decree addressed to certain officials at Koptos with Minemhat appearing as the first one with the titles royal sealer and mayor of Koptos. The decree is about the removal of Teti, Son of Minhotep, from his position in the temple at Koptos.

Mining Expedition
At Gebel Zeit, several mining expeditions went to the galena mines, often departing from Coptos (Quft). There is evidence of Min worship indicating a relation to the Temple of Min at Coptos. The stela erected by Minemhat, a nomarch of Coptos, indicating his participation in a mining expedition during the 17th Dynasty.

Associated with Seqenenre Djehuty-aa
Minemhat appears on a box in the burial of Hornakht, showing that he had links to officials at Thebes. Other items in the burial of Hornakht also mentions Sobeknakht of Elkab and king Djehuty-aa.

References 

Officials of the Seventeenth Dynasty of Egypt